Cardinal Stritch University is a private Roman Catholic university with its primary campus in Fox Point and Glendale, Wisconsin. Its enrollment as of Fall 2021 was 1,365.

History
Cardinal Stritch University was founded in 1937 as St. Clare College by the Sisters of St. Francis of Assisi on Milwaukee's south side as an institution to help the order's sisters effectively train as teachers. The sisters opened a reading clinic in 1943 to help promote literacy in the area, still existing today as the Cardinal Stritch University Literacy Centers operating throughout the Milwaukee area.

In 1946, the college was renamed Cardinal Stritch College in honor of the Archdiocese of Milwaukee's Cardinal Samuel Stritch. The college opened its programs to lay women for the first time and was subsequently accredited by the North Central Association of Colleges and Schools in 1953.

Stritch established its first graduate program in 1956, offering majors in special education and reading. The university also opened its doors to men that year, becoming fully co-educational in 1970.

Stritch moved to its current campus in the northern Milwaukee suburb of Fox Point in 1962. This new campus allowed the college to begin many new programs such as the nursing program in 1980 and its College of Business and Management in 1982.

Cardinal Stritch College was renamed Cardinal Stritch University in 1997 with the university's first doctorate program offered the following year, the Doctorate in Leadership for the Advancement of Learning and Service. A $14 million expansion and renovation of the university occurred in 2006 with the introduction of online degree programs.

Campus
In addition to campus, Cardinal Stritch University offers degree programs online.

Campus
The campus is located on a 40-acre campus 9 miles north of Milwaukee in the suburbs of Fox Point and Glendale. The campus sits on private land accessible from roads on the eastern and western edges. Lake Michigan is less than one mile east of campus.

Facilities

Administration 
 Bonaventure Hall – home to the university's administrative offices including the Office of the President and departmental offices for the College of Arts and Sciences, College of Business and Management, and the College of Education and Leadership.

Academic 
 Duns Scotus Hall – the university's main academic building housing classrooms and the International Education office
 Roger Bacon Hall – home to the Ruth S. Coleman College of Nursing and Health Sciences and labs for biology and chemistry
 Library – includes Information Commons, main collection, Instructional Materials Center collection, Franciscan Center Library, and other resources

Arts 
 Joan Steele Stein Center for Communication Studies/Fine Arts – houses the communication, music, theater and art departments along with classrooms, offices, studios, and the university's theaters

Athletic 
 Fieldhouse – the hub of Stritch Athletics housing athletic offices, gymnasium, workout facility, locker rooms and indoor running track

Residence halls/student union 
 Clare Residence Hall - also home to the Department of Residence Life and Student Health Services
 Assisi Residence Hall - converted into a residence hall in 2009 from the old College of Education building
 Serra Hall - dining hall
 Campus Center - home to the student union, student lounge, the Bean coffee shop, and campus ministry offices

Academics
Cardinal Stritch University offers more than 60 fields of study throughout four colleges, offering bachelor, master, and doctorate degrees. Programs are set up for traditional undergraduates, adult undergraduate, graduate, and online programs

Athletics
The Cardinal Stritch athletic teams are called the Wolves. The university is a member of the National Association of Intercollegiate Athletics (NAIA), primarily competing in the Chicagoland Collegiate Athletic Conference (CCAC) since the 1997–98 academic year. The Wolves previously competed in the defunct Lake Michigan Conference of the NCAA Division III ranks from 1974–75 to 1996–97.

Cardinal Stritch competes in 13 intercollegiate varsity sports: Men's sports include basketball, cross country, soccer, tennis, track & field and volleyball; women's sports include basketball, cross country, soccer, softball, tennis, track & field and volleyball.

Basketball
The Cardinal Stritch men's basketball team won the Lake Michigan Conference men's basketball championship in 1987. The men's team was also five-time National Little College Athletic Association (now the United States Collegiate Athletic Association) Great Lakes District men's basketball champion from 1983 to 1987.

The Cardinal Stritch men's basketball team won the NAIA Division II National Championship in 2013. After being ranked number one in seven straight polls, they were knocked out of the 2014 NAIA Men's Division II basketball tournament in the second round.

Track & field
In 2016, the men's indoor track and field team accomplished a first in Stritch history with a seventh-place finish at the NAIA indoor track and field nationals.

Notable alumni
 Rosemary Hinkfuss – Wisconsin State Representative
 John E. McCoy – U.S. Air National Guard brigadier general
 Kimberla Lawson Roby – author
 Anthony Shumaker – Major League Baseball player
 Marijuana Pepsi Vandyck – American education professional

Notable faculty
 Tamara Grigsby – Wisconsin State Representative
 Yasmin Mogahed – author, educator and first female instructor at the AlMaghrib Institute
 Marion Verhaalen – composer and musicologist

References

External links
 
 Official athletics website

 
Franciscan universities and colleges
Glendale, Wisconsin
Catholic universities and colleges in Wisconsin
Universities and colleges in Milwaukee
Universities and colleges in Hennepin County, Minnesota
Association of Catholic Colleges and Universities
Educational institutions established in 1937
1937 establishments in Wisconsin
Roman Catholic Archdiocese of Milwaukee